Margaret Mary "Bunty" Greenland (21 December 1912 – 26 August 1998) was a British alpine skier. She competed in the women's slalom at the 1948 Winter Olympics.

References

1912 births
1998 deaths
British female alpine skiers
Olympic alpine skiers of Great Britain
Alpine skiers at the 1948 Winter Olympics
Place of birth missing